Lake Helen is a lake in the U.S. state of Wyoming's Big Horn Mountains.  It is in the Cloud Peak Wilderness Area and may only be accessed by backpacking or on horse.  The elevation of the lake is 9968 feet.

External links
 Lakes in the county

Helen
Helen